Los Conales is a hamlet eight kilometers north of the city of La Unión. The hamlets lies along the Southern Railway of Chile.

References

Geography of Los Ríos Region
Populated places in Ranco Province